Admiral Thomas Bridgeman Lethbridge (28 October 1829 – 30 December 1892) was a Royal Navy officer who went on to be Commander-in-Chief, The Nore.

Naval career
Born the son of Captain Robert Lethbridge RN, Thomas Lethbridge joined the Royal Navy in 1843. Promoted to captain in 1863, he commanded HMS Himalaya, HMS Simoom, HMS Trafalgar, HMS Northumberland, HMS Black Prince and then HMS Duncan. He was appointed Senior Officer, Coast of Ireland Station in 1883 and Commander-in-Chief, The Nore in 1888. He retired in 1890.

References

|-

1829 births
1892 deaths
Royal Navy admirals